Pikes Peak National Cemetery is a  Department of Veteran Affairs (VA) national cemetery located in El Paso County, Colorado. The cemetery serves the burial needs of veterans, their spouses and eligible family members. When fully developed, the cemetery will have 95,000 graves and columbarian niches.

History and location
The cemetery, the third national cemetery established in Colorado, opened in 2018. The cemetery occupies land that was once the Rolling Hills Ranch. It is located between Bradley and Drennan roads in unincorporated El Paso County southeast of Colorado Springs.

References

External links
 Official website
 
 

United States national cemeteries
Cemeteries in Colorado
Protected areas of El Paso County, Colorado
2018 establishments in Colorado